The Bob White Covered Bridge, also known as the Lower Covered Bridge or Woolwine Covered Bridge, was a county-owned wooden covered bridge that spanned the Smith River in Patrick County, Virginia, United States. It was located on the old portion of Bob White Road (SR 869) off State Route 8 southeast of the community of Woolwine, about 13 miles (21 kilometers) north of Stuart. Coordinates were  (36.779117, −80.247572).

Built in 1921, the 80-foot (24-meter) bridge was a Queen-post truss construction over two spans. Its WGCB number was 46-68-01. The Bob White Covered Bridge was listed on the National Register of Historic Places on May 22, 1973. It was one of two historic covered bridges remaining in Patrick County, maintained by the Patrick County government. The bridge washed away and was destroyed in major flooding on September 29, 2015, and subsequently removed from the National Register in 2017.

History
The Bob White Covered Bridge was constructed by Walter G. Weaver of Woolwine, named for the former Bob White Post Office, which in turn was named after the bobwhite quails that inhabit the area. It served as an access route to the Smith River Church of the Brethren, located on the south side of the river. The bridge was bypassed to the west with a concrete bridge in 1981. Although closed to motor traffic, the Bob White Covered Bridge still attracted numerous visitors. The bridge was the site of annual horse-drawn wagon rides as part of the Patrick County Covered Bridge Festival held every June.

See also
List of bridges on the National Register of Historic Places in Virginia
List of covered bridges in Virginia

References

 Dale J. Travis Covered Bridges. Bob White CB: Credits. Retrieved Nov. 13, 2007.
 Virginia is for Lovers: Covered Bridges in Virginia. Bob White CB: Credits. Retrieved Nov. 13, 2007.
 Virginia Department of Transportation. Bob White CB: Credits. Retrieved Nov. 13, 2007.
 Tc2U Photographs. Bob White CB: Credits. Retrieved Nov. 13, 2007.
 Patrick County Chamber of Commerce. Bob White CB: Credits. Retrieved Nov. 13, 2007.

External links 
Bob White Covered Bridge (Virginia Department of Transportation)
Bob White Covered Bridge (Virginia Tourism Corporation)
Bob White Covered Bridge (Dale J. Travis)

Bridges completed in 1921
Covered bridges on the National Register of Historic Places in Virginia
Wooden bridges in Virginia
Transportation in Patrick County, Virginia
Tourist attractions in Patrick County, Virginia
National Register of Historic Places in Patrick County, Virginia
Buildings and structures demolished in 2015
Road bridges on the National Register of Historic Places in Virginia
Burr Truss bridges in the United States
Former National Register of Historic Places in Virginia
1921 establishments in Virginia
2015 disestablishments in Virginia
Buildings and structures destroyed by flooding